Daffedar is a 2016 Indian Malayalam-language drama film directed by Johnson Esthappan, starring Tini Tom as Daffadar and Malavika Nair in lead roles. Ilaiyaraaja is the music director and the film's audio was launched by Kerala chief minister Pinarayi Vijayan.

Plot

Daffadar is the story Ayyappan, a 65 years old honest, sincere, and compassionate security personnel (Daffadar) of the Collector for over 40 years. Evenafter his retirement he dresses as Daffadar and goes to the Collectorate every day.

Cast

Tini Tom as Ayyapan
Malavika Nair
Sudheer Karamana
Chembil Ashokan
Indrans
Devan
Kavitha Nair
Jayakrishnan
Geetha Vijayan
Neerav Bavlecha unni kannan
Anjali Aneesh Upasana

Production
The film originally starred Kalabhavan Mani and Ananya, with its pooja function in 2014, but the film was almost dropped after the death of Mani. The filming resumed in 2016 with Tini Tom and Malavika Nair replacing Mani and Ananya respectively.

Soundtrack
The soundtrack album was composed by Ilaiyaraaja, with lyrics written by Rafeeq Ahamed.

References

External links
 

2016 films
2010s Malayalam-language films
Films scored by Ilaiyaraaja